WRNE (980 AM) is a radio station broadcasting an urban adult contemporary format. Licensed to Gulf Breeze, Florida, the station serves the Pensacola area. It is owned by Media One Communications, Inc.  Its studios are in Ensley, Florida (with a Pensacola address), and its transmitter is near Avalon Beach, Florida.

The station was first licensed, as WBOP, on November 27, 1956. The station's call sign was changed to WCHZ on July 18, 1985. On July 3, 1986, the station changed its call sign to WFXP and, on December 28, 1990, to WRNE.

References

External links

RNE
Radio stations established in 1956
Urban adult contemporary radio stations in the United States
1956 establishments in Florida